Bylakuppe is an area in Karnataka which is home to the Indian town Bylakuppe and several Tibetan settlements (there are several Tibetan settlements in India), established by Lugsum Samdupling (in 1961) and Dickyi Larsoe (in 1969). Bylakuppe is the second largest Tibetan settlement in the world outside Tibet after Dharamshala. It is located to the west of Mysore district in the Indian state of Karnataka which is roughly 80 km from Mysore city.

History
A few years later another settlement, Tibetan Dickey Larsoe, also called TDL, was established. This was followed by the establishment of three more settlements in Karnataka state making it the state with the largest Tibetan refugee population. 

The Government of India built special schools for Tibetans that provide free education, health care and scholarships for those students who excel in school. There are a few medical and civil engineering seats reserved for Tibetans. Tibetans live in India with a stay permit which is processed through a document called Registration Certificate (RC). It is renewed every year, or half-year in some areas. Every Tibetan refugee above the age of 16 must register for the stay permit. RCs are not issued to new arrival refugees. The Indian Government also issues "Yellow Books" after one years' processing with a RC, which allow Tibetans to travel abroad which is an Identity Certificate.

Population
The town is mainly inhabited by Tibetans who, according to a demographic survey carried out by the Central Tibetan Administration's Planning Commission in 1998, accounted for 50,727 individuals at that time. However, it is unclear whether these figures included the Vajrayana Buddhist monks living there. Today, an estimated 70,000 Tibetans live in the settlements; these were established on land leased by the state government to accommodate some of the Tibetan expatriates who came to resettle in India after 1959. Bylakuppe consists of a number of agricultural settlements, colonies are close to each other, and has number of monasteries and temples in all the major Tibetan Buddhist traditions. Most notable among them are the large educational monastic institution Sera Monastery, the smaller Tashi Lhunpo Monastery (both in the Gelug tradition) and Namdroling Monastery (in the Nyingma tradition). Bylakuppe also has many Buddhist universities for advanced Buddhist practices.

Tibetan Buddhist Monasteries and Study Centres of Bylakuppe
 Namdroling Monastery of Nyingma Also known as Golden Temple 
 Drigung Kagyud Monastery
 Sakya Monastery
 Sera je Monastery
 Sera Mey Monastery
 Tashi Lhunpo monastery in Bylakuppe was newly built. Inaugurated by Dalai Lama in 2016.

Facilities
Bylakuppe is a small town. It has a police station, commercial banks, a telephone exchange, a post office, lodges and hotels. Transport facilities such as buses, auto-rickshaws and taxis are also available. PAP (Protected Area Permit) is mandatory for foreigners to stay here overnight, which can take up to three months to be issued.

Accessibility
Bylakuppe is situated on the state highway 88 (now NH 275) and is well connected to most of the major cities in south-India. Bus facilities are available from major towns like Mysuru, Bengaluru, Mangaluru, Chennai, Panaji, etc. Following are the distances between Bylakuppe and other cities in kilometers: Kushalanagar(05),Mysuru (82), Bengaluru  (222), Mangaluru (172), Mandya (122), Chennai (582), Hassan (80), Madikeri (36), Kasaragod (145), Kozhikode (190).

Main attractions 
 Ingalakere: Largest lake in Mysore district
 Namdroling Monastery (Golden Temple)
 Sera Monastery
 Other Buddhist monasteries, schools and settlements

Image gallery

Climate
Köppen-Geiger climate classification system classifies its climate as tropical wet and dry (Aw).

See also
 Kaveri Nisargadhama
 Dubare Elephant camp
 Kushalanagar

References

External links

Brief description of Dickyi Larsoe
Brief description of Lugsum Samdupling
 Namdroling Monastery THE GOLDEN TEMPLE 
Sera Mey Monastery
Sera Jey Monastery
Tashi Lhunpo Monastery

Tibetan diaspora in India
Cities and towns in Mysore district
Buildings and structures in Mysore district
Tourist attractions in Mysore district